Wiggle matching, also known as carbon–14 wiggle-match dating (WMD) is a dating method that uses the non-linear relationship between 14C age and calendar age to match the shape of a series of closely sequentially spaced 14C dates with the 14C calibration curve. A numerical approach to WMD allows one to assess the precision of WMD chronologies. The method has both advantages and limitations vis-a-vis the calibration of individual dates. High-precision chronologies are needed for studies of rapid climate changes.  
Andrew Millard refers to wiggle matching as a way of dealing with the flat portion of the carbon 14 calibration graph that is known as the Hallstatt plateau, named after the Hallstatt culture period in central Europe with which it coincides.

References

Dating methodologies in archaeology